Pat Moore was a Republican member of the Alabama House of Representatives elected in 2006.  She served one term and was defeated for re-nomination in the Republican primary in 2010.  She lost to Allen Farley who then was elected in November without opposition.

Moore is involved in real estate investment and timber farming.  She and her husband Dan live in Pleasant Grove, Alabama with their two children.

Moore received her bachelor's degree from Auburn University and has a master's degree in mathematics education from the University of Alabama.

References
Vote Smart bio on Moore

Women state legislators in Alabama
Republican Party members of the Alabama House of Representatives
Auburn University alumni
University of Alabama alumni
Living people
People from Pleasant Grove, Alabama
Year of birth missing (living people)
21st-century American women